Liberty Arming the Patriot, sometimes called Freedom Arming the Patriot, is a bronze sculpture at Park Place in Pawtucket, Rhode Island, commemorating the participation of the city's citizens in the American Civil War. It was designed by William Granville Hastings and cast by the Gorham Manufacturing Company in 1897. Unlike many Civil War memorials, Liberty Arming the Patriot is a dynamic composition, depicting a young farmer setting his plow aside, and reaching to take a sword from a classical female figure clad in breastplate and wielding a pike. The sculpture was listed on the National Register of Historic Places in 2001.

History and design 

The sculpture was commissioned by the Ladies' Soldiers' Memorial Association of Pawtucket, Rhode Island to honor those who served in the American Civil War. The funding for the sculpture came as the result of an 11-year fundraising campaign that was provided for by donations and entertainment events. The cost of the monument was stated to be $13,000 by The New York Times, but report stated it to be $12,000. William Granville Hastings was chosen as the sculptor to execute the construction of the monument after winning a competition. The sculpture was cast by the Gorham Manufacturing Company.

The central feature of the monument depicts the theme of a young man called from civil life to serve his nation in a time of need and it transforms the theme into a contemporary allegory. It captures the decisive moment as farmer is caught mid-transition, with his left hand still on the plow handle, and taking the sword with his right hand from Liberty. The details of the farmer includes realistic work clothes, a yoked shirt with rolled sleeves and work trousers tucked into his boots. Liberty, identified by her Phrygian cap, stands just above the farmer in classical robes with a breastplate, sandals and cloak. Her face is impassive as she bestows the sword upon the farmer with her left hand while her right hand holds her pike.

Beneath the farmer and Liberty is a bronze plaque depicting a Union artillery battery under the command of General Ambrose Burnside capturing a bridge in the Battle of Antietam. Flanked on the sides are two smaller triangular plaques which depict the female figures of History and Eternity. The Scribe of History, alternatively known as Epic Poetry, is writing on a tablet and Eternity both contemplates and is identified by a fern.

According to the National Register of Historic Places, Liberty Arming the Patriot is historically significant as a "good representative of the character of early twentieth century figurative sculpture" and the quality of its design. It is also historically significant for its association with the Gorham Manufacturing Company, a prominent Rhode Island producer of high quality silverware and bronze statuary. Though it is commemorative in intention, the statue is important "because it documents the principal effort of Pawtucket to honor those who served in the Civil War." The sculpture was added to the National Register of Historic Places in 2001.

Inscription

See also
National Register of Historic Places listings in Pawtucket, Rhode Island

References

Monuments and memorials on the National Register of Historic Places in Rhode Island
Monuments and memorials in Rhode Island
Buildings and structures in Pawtucket, Rhode Island
1897 sculptures
Bronze sculptures in Rhode Island
Statues in Rhode Island
1897 establishments in Rhode Island
Sculptures of men in Rhode Island
Sculptures of women in Rhode Island
National Register of Historic Places in Pawtucket, Rhode Island
Outdoor sculptures in Rhode Island